Willie Gibson (born 3 April 1953) is a Scottish former professional footballer who played as a forward.

Career
Born in St Andrews, Gibson played for Methil Star, Hearts, Partick Thistle, Raith Rovers and Cowdenbeath.

References

1953 births
Living people
Scottish footballers
Heart of Midlothian F.C. players
Partick Thistle F.C. players
Raith Rovers F.C. players
Cowdenbeath F.C. players
Scottish Football League players
Association football forwards
Scottish Football League representative players
Sportspeople from St Andrews
Footballers from Fife